SS Principe Umberto was an Italian passenger and refrigerated cargo ship built in 1908 for Navigazione Generale Italiana. During World War I, Principe Umberto served as an armed merchant cruiser.

While transporting troops in the Adriatic in June 1916, the ship was sunk by Austro-Hungarian U-boat  with the loss of 1,926 men. It was the worst naval disaster of World War I in terms of human lives lost.

Career 

Principe Umberto was built in 1908 by the Cantieri Navali del Tirreno in Palermo for the Navigazione Generale Italiana a company that sailed to Mediterranean and Black Sea ports, as well as passenger service to North and South America.

Principe Umbertos routes and early activities are not known, but during World War I, the ship was employed as an armed merchant cruiser to transport men and materiel in support of Italy.

On 8 June 1916, Principe Umberto and another transport, the Ravenna, were carrying the 55th Infantry Regiment (col. Ernesto Piano) back from Albania to Italy, under the escort of the Italian scout cruiser Libia and four  Regia Marina destroyers. The Austro-Hungarian U-boat , under the command of Friedrich Schlosser, launched a torpedo attack that successfully hit the Italian ship. Principe Umberto went down quickly with the loss of 1,926 men (1,750 according to other sources).

The wreck was discovered in May 2022 off the coast of Albania near Cape of Gjuhez using an underwater robot by the Swiss-Italian engineer Guido Gay.

See also 
List by death toll of ships sunk by submarines

References

Bibliography 

 
 

World War I passenger ships of Italy
World War I naval ships of Italy
World War I shipwrecks in the Adriatic Sea
Ships sunk by Austro-Hungarian submarines
Maritime incidents in 1916
1909 ships
Ships built in Palermo
Ships built by Cantieri Navali del Tirreno e Riuniti